The 2012 Hougang by-election was held on 26 May 2012 with Png Eng Huat from the Worker's Party as the winning candidate. This followed the expulsion of Yaw Shin Leong from the Worker's Party on 15 February 2012, which he decided not to appeal. On 22 February 2012, Parliament Speaker Michael Palmer declared the seat vacant, effective from the date of expulsion, as required by the Constitution.

This was the 16th by-election since the first election, and the first by-election after over 19 years since 1992. This was the first by-election in Singapore since the new millennium and the 21st century. 

Nomination day was held on 16 May 2012, with the polling day held on 26 May 2012. 23,368 people were eligible to vote. WP candidate Png Eng Huat was declared Member of Parliament-elect after winning 62.08% of the vote.

Background

This by-election was the result of the expulsion of Yaw Shin Leong, Member of Parliament (MP) for Hougang Single Member Constituency, from the Workers' Party of Singapore (WP). This caused Yaw to lose his responsibility as the WP treasurer. Under Article 46(2)(b) of the Constitution of the Republic of Singapore, an MP's Parliamentary seat falls vacant if the MP is expelled from the party under whose banner he or she stood for election. The last MP to have been expelled from his party was Chiam See Tong, who was ousted from the Singapore Democratic Party in 1993 (but reinstated in December the same year after a ruling by the High Court).

At a media conference on 15 February 2012, the Workers' Party announced the expulsion of Yaw. According to the party chairman Sylvia Lim, she said that Yaw has been accused of several indiscretions in his private life while being asked many times to come forward and explain himself to the party but he did not do so, resulting in him committing a party misconduct and lost faith, trust and expectations of the party and the residents of the Hougang SMC. The announcement came after weeks of speculation and rumours that Yaw had an alleged extramarital affair with a fellow party member. Within 30 minutes of 20:37, news reports detailed the mixed reactions among Hougang residents to Yaw Shin Leong's expulsion, Prime Minister Lee Hsien Loong's comment that there is no fixed time within which a by-election must be called, and People's Action Party Chairman Khaw Boon Wan's quote that Hougang voters have been misled by the WP.

On 17 February 2012, the Clerk of the Parliament gave Yaw ten days to reply to the expulsion, but two days later, he wrote a letter that he chose not to appeal against the party's decision; the Speaker Michael Palmer, then announced the vacancy of the seat as of the date of the expulsion.

In the days following the announcement, a war of words ensued between Aljunied GRC MP Low Thia Khiang, former MP Ho Kah Leong and government press secretary Foo Kok Jwee in the letters columns of the Lianhe Zaobao and The Straits Times over the degree to which the situation compared to the last by-election in 1992 and whether or not the expulsion of Yaw was an "abuse of the democratic system" to save the party's integrity.

Commentator Eugene Tan, assistant professor of law at the Singapore Management University School of Law, discussed how the Parliamentary Elections Act applied to the situation. Tan stated that although it was the President who issued the writ for election, it was the Prime Minister who advised on the matter, and that it was thus Lee who effectively controlled the election date. Tan argued that although the Constitution did not impose a timeframe within which a by-election had to be held, it was not the intent that this should allow elections to be postponed indefinitely. The fact that the Constitution is silent on exactly when by-elections should be called should not be taken as permission not to call them at all. "In short," he wrote, "the 'default' position should be that a by-election should be automatic, although there is no hard and fast rule on the timing." Tan also opined that the Workers' Party should field as its candidate in the by-election someone not already in Parliament, rather than a Non-constituency MP. Chee Soon Juan, Secretary-General of the Singapore Democratic Party, stated that it was his party's "primary concern that Hougang remains in the hands of the opposition", declaring that it would therefore not field a candidate that would split the vote.

Other WP MPs had been covering Yaw's former duties in Hougang SMC. Mr Tan argued that this state of affairs should not continue for the projected remaining term of the current Parliament of four and a half years. "[...] the cardinal principle of representation is crucial: A stand-in MP is not the same as an MP for whom the majority had voted. Not calling a by-election would undermine the importance of representation in our maturing parliamentary democracy", he wrote.

Confirmation of by-election
On 9 May 2012, President Tony Tan Keng Yam issued a writ of election for the electoral division of Hougang. Nominations were held on 16 May at Serangoon Junior College and polls are conducted on 26 May.

With the confirmation, Singapore was set to experience a by-election in nearly 20 years since the 1992 Marine Parade by-election thereby setting a record for the longest interval between by-elections.

Candidates
On 10 May 2012, the PAP announced in a press conference that Desmond Choo would be their candidate. This is the second time Choo is contesting in the Hougang ward. Later, at about 4 pm, the WP announced in a press conference that Png Eng Huat would be the candidate; Png previously contested for the East Coast Group Representation Constituency in the 2011 general elections.

Two other potential candidates had originally also signalled their intent to run, having collected their political donation certificates, a prerequisite for contesting. They were Poh Lee Guan, a WP member who eventually dropped out by not submitting his nomination papers; and Zeng Guoyan, an independent candidate who filed his nomination papers but was disqualified for having a public offence on police record. In July 2012, Poh was expelled by WP for his actions, as he had not consulted the party council prior to collecting the certificates.

Results
At 10.30pm (SGT), results were announced by Returning Officer Yam Ah Mee at Holy Innocents' High School where WP's Png retained Hougang SMC with 62.08% of the valid votes, beating PAP's Choo with 37.92%.

See also
Vellama d/o Marie Muthu v. Attorney-General - a 2013 court case relating to the by-election and Casual vacancy

Footnotes

References

Further reading
 

2012 elections in Asia
2012 in Singapore
2012
May 2012 events in Asia